2020 was a leap year in the Gregorian calendar.

2020, Twenty Twenty, 20:20 or 20/20 may also refer to:
20/20, normal visual acuity
Twenty20, a form of cricket

Films and television
Twenty:20 (film), an Indian Malayalam-language film
 20/20 (Canadian TV program), a documentary program that aired on CBC Television from 1962 to 1967
 20/20 (New Zealand TV programme), a 1993–2014 news program
 20/20 (American TV program), a news program broadcast on ABC since 1978
 2020 (miniseries), a MediaCorp Channel News Asia (CNA) web series
 Twenty Twenty Television, a UK TV production company

Music
 2020 (Bon Jovi album)
 2020 (Richard Dawson album)
 20/20 (band), an American power pop band
 20/20 (20/20 album)
 20/20 (Beach Boys album)
 20/20 (Dilated Peoples album)
 20/20 (George Benson album)
 20/20 (Saga album) (2012)
 20/20 (Spyro Gyra album)
 20/20 (Trip Lee album)
 20/20, an album by Knuckle Puck
 "20/20" (song), by Lil Tjay
 "20/20", a song by Gaz Coombes
 "20/20", a song by the Vaccines from English Graffiti
 20 Twenty (F.T. Island album)
 Twenty Twenty (band), a British pop-punk band
 Twenty Twenty (album), a 2020 album by Ronan Keating
 Twenty Twenty – The Essential T Bone Burnett (2006)
 twentytwenty (Sara Niemietz album), a 2020 live album

Other uses
 20/20 (spreadsheet software), an early multi-platform spreadsheet program
 20Twenty (bank), a defunct online South African bank
 2020 group, a faction of centre-left Conservative MPs in the United Kingdom
 MD 20/20, a brand of wine by Mogen David

See also
 Australia 2020 Summit
 Cyberpunk 2020, a cyberpunk role-playing game
 DECSYSTEM-2020, a model of computer in the DECSYSTEM-20 line
 Names of numbers in English
The 20/20 Experience, an album by Justin Timberlake
 2020 Summer Olympics
 2020 in the United States
 2020 Vision (disambiguation)